Paulo Freire: The Man from Recife is a 2011 biography of the Brazilian educator and philosopher Paulo Freire written by James D. Kirylo.

Reviews
Donaldo Macedo, author of numerous books and one who collaborated with Freire, asserted that Kirylo's “insightful book is a great complement to  Freire’s Letters to Cristina and Ana Maria Araújo Freire’s Paulo Freire: Uma História de Vida…  Reading Kirylo’s book reminds me how I feel enormously to have an opportunity to work and collaborate with Paulo Freire so closely for many years.”

According to Peter McLaren, "Paulo Freire has cultivated the ground for a long revolution, and James D. Kirylo's outstanding new work has skillfully illuminated this in ways few books on Freire have managed to accomplish."

References

External links
 The Freire Project
 Ptoweb

Brazilian biographies
Books about education